A phosphoprotein is a protein that is posttranslationally modified by the attachment of either a single phosphate group, or a complex molecule such as 5'-phospho-DNA, through a phosphate group. The target amino acid is most often serine, threonine, or tyrosine residues (mostly in eukaryotes), or aspartic acid or histidine residues (mostly in prokaryotes).

Biological function
The phosphorylation of proteins is a major regulatory mechanism in cells.

Clinical significance
Phosphoproteins have been proposed as biomarkers for breast cancer.

See also
Protein phosphorylation

References

Phosphoproteins